Local government areas covering the whole of Scotland were first defined by the Local Government (Scotland) Act 1889. As currently defined, they are a result, for the most part, of the Local Government etc (Scotland) Act 1994.

The 1889 Act created a country-wide system of local government based on pre-existing counties and burghs. Prior to this act burghs had their own elected local government councils but counties did not.

The county and burgh system was abolished by the Local Government (Scotland) Act 1973 and replaced by a system of regions and districts and single-tier islands council areas.

The 1994 Act abolished the regions and districts and replaced them with a new system entirely composed of single-tier authorities; the Orkney, Shetland and Western Isles councils were continued by s.3 of the Act in substantially unchanged form.

1889 to 1930

Over this period local government in Scotland was based on three units: counties, burghs and parishes.

Counties
The Local Government (Scotland) Act 1889 reformed the administration of counties and also made alterations to their number and boundaries: Ross-shire and Cromartyshire were combined to form Ross and Cromarty; the Lower, Middle and Upper Wards of the County of Lanark, which formed separate counties for some purposes, were merged; and Orkney and Zetland were divided into distinct counties. A boundary commission was appointed, and between 1891 and 1892 many anomalies in county boundaries were rectified. In 1890 each of thirty-three counties was given a county council, partly elected, and partly co-opted by the town councils of burghs in the county. In effect the county council only exercised full powers in the "landward" areas of the county, outside of burgh boundaries.

Districts
County councils were required to divide their county into districts, each of which was under the supervision of a district committee with powers and duties independent of the county council in regard to highways and public health.

The district committee was composed of the county councillors elected for the area along with one representative from the parochial board of each parish in the district. Burgh councils could transfer the maintenance of the highways and bridges of the town to the county council, whereupon a representative of the burgh was appointed to the committee. In counties with fewer than six parishes, the county council was not obliged to form districts.

Burghs

Burghs were a form of town government dating back to the twelfth century. Originally created by charter, and mainly concerned with trading privileges, they had been reformed earlier in the nineteenth century. Legislation enacted in 1833 allowed the inhabitants of existing burghs to adopt a "police system" allowing for the paving, lighting, cleansing, watching, supplying with water, and improving of the town. A further act of 1850 could be adopted by any place with a population of 700 which thereupon became a "police burgh". Those burghs which had not adopted a police system were abolished in 1893. Burghs were largely autonomous, and when county councils were established they had a limited jurisdiction within burgh boundaries.

Counties of cities
The royal burgh of Edinburgh was, by virtue of various charters, a  "county and city" and entirely outside the jurisdiction of Midlothian County Council. In 1893 Glasgow became a county of a city by private act of parliament Dundee followed in 1894 and Aberdeen in 1899.

Parishes

The lowest tier of local government was the parish. Parochial boards had been established in 1845 for the administration of poor law, and, outside burghs, had gradually acquired various public health duties. In 1894 they were replaced with elected parish councils.

Education areas
In 1919 Scotland was divided into education areas. These consisted of the four counties of cities, the burgh of Leith and each of the local government counties. In the case of the counties, they were to include "every burgh situated therein". The education authorities were elected under proportional representation, and unlike the county councils, all members were directly elected.

1930 to 1975

By 1928 Scotland had 1,298 different local authorities, many of them overlapping. In November the Scottish Office issued a bill to reform local government: this sought to abolish 1,064 of the various bodies, leaving only 33 county councils and 201 burgh councils. Burghs (other than the counties of cities) were to be divided into two classes: large burghs and small burghs. Large burghs were to gain considerable powers from the county councils. Small burghs, conversely, were to cede most of their duties to the county councils.

The original bill was altered in the course of passage through parliament. In response to protests that the abolition of both parish councils and district committees left a gap in the system, the landward part of each county was to be divided into districts, governed by councils consisting partly of the county councillors for the area and partly of elected district councillors. The final act also provided for the combination of a number of neighbouring small burghs, and paired Kinross-shire and Perthshire and Nairnshire and Moray into "combined counties". The individual counties and county councils continued to exist in these areas, but a joint county council became the principal local authority.

Following the changes, which came into effect in 1930, the following were the local government areas into which Scotland was divided:
The four counties of cities
29 counties
2 combined counties
Large burghs (those with a population of 20,000 or more, plus Arbroath)
Small burghs
Landward districts

This system was restated in the consolidating Local Government (Scotland) Act 1947. The number of small burghs increased and the number of districts declined over the time period. Neither the 1929 or 1947 legislation contained a procedure by which a small burgh could become a large burgh on reaching sufficient population. Accordingly, only one new large burgh was formed at East Kilbride, which required the passing of a local act of parliament in 1967.

1973 to 1996

The Local Government (Scotland) Act 1973 created a system of nine two-tier regions and three single-tier islands council areas, and this system completely replaced local government counties and burghs in 1975.

Each two-tier region had a regional council and of a number of district subdivisions, each with its own district council. The number of districts in each region varied from three to 19.

The 1973 Act was based closely on proposals in the Wheatley Report, produced by a Royal Commission into Scottish local government in 1969. The new regions and districts were generally very different from the counties and districts which they replaced.

Two of the new islands council areas had the boundaries of former counties. The third consisted of an area formerly divided between two counties.

1994 to present

References

Local government in Scotland